Podilski Tovtry National Nature Park is a national park, located in Khmelnytskyi and Kamianets-Podilskyi Raions (districts) of Khmelnytskyi Oblast (province) in the southern region of the western Ukraine. It is the largest nature conservation area in Ukraine.

The National Environmental Park "Podilski Tovtry" was created on the decree #476/96 of the President of Ukraine, then Leonid Kuchma, on July 27, 1996, in order to maintain and protect the natural landscape of the Podillia region. The park is a nature-conservational, recreational, culturally enlightening, and scientifically researching institution of national importance. According to the Law of Ukraine of September 21, 2000 #1989-III, the National nature park "Podilski Tovtry" belongs to the National Ecological Network of Ukraine of the Podillya region (Podillya).

General overview

The park's area covers 2,613.16 km2 (645,725.9 acre). There are 1,700 different types of flora, 60 of which are included in the Red Book of Ukraine. Also, there are 217 different types of fauna, 29 of which are included in the Red Book of Ukraine as well. In total there are 127 objects of nature conservation which contain about 3,000 different types, forms, and sorts of plants.

The park is divided into several functional zones: sacred zone, regulated recreation zone, stationary recreation zone, and managed zone. In those zones are located 21 stationary recreation institutions (such as sanatoriums, profilactoriums, tourist resorts, holiday homes, etc.), some 160 industrial companies, collective and individual farming that cause harm to nature. Therefore, the main goal of the National nature park is the preservation of natural diversity, creation of the organized zones of recreation and wellness.

The park's natural borders serve Zbruch River to the west (south from the Sataniv town), Dniester to the south towards the mouth of Ushytsia River, former administrative borders of the Nova Ushytsia and Dunaivtsi Raions to the east, the Dymytrov, Ordzhonikidze, Vatutin collective farms (Horodok Raion) to the north.

The park includes some 14% of state forest fund, over 13% of collective farm forests, and other territories of the region.

Major landmarks
 15 various state reserves
 4 state monuments of nature
 Botanical garden
 Bakota Bay (Ramsar sites in Ukraine)
 Lower Smotrych River (Ramsar sites in Ukraine)

Cultural and historical landmarks
 19 archaeological sights
 302 monuments of historical and cultural heritage (including the Kamianets-Podilskyi Castle), 205 of which are located in the city of Kamianets-Podilskyi

Arden Predator Park Rehabilitation Center 
On the territory of the park with an area of 32.25 hectares, located within the forest plots of the SE "Yarmolynetske Forestry" in quarters 11 (units 2, 3, 6, 7, 9, 10) and 12 (units 1, 5, 6) the Rehabilitation Center "Park of predators Arden" is located, in which residents and undergoing rehabilitation of predatory animals such as brown and Himalayan bears, wolves and foxes, as well as birds of prey.

See also
 Kamianets-Podilskyi Castle

Gallery

References

External links
 

Geography of Khmelnytskyi Oblast
National parks of Ukraine
Protected areas of Ukraine
Tourist attractions in Khmelnytskyi Oblast
Natural heritage sites in Ukraine
Primeval Beech Forests in Europe
Ramsar sites in Ukraine
Central European mixed forests